Eremnophila is a genus of thread-waisted wasps in the family Sphecidae, found mainly in North, Central, and South America. There are about nine described species in Eremnophila.

Species
These nine species belong to the genus Eremnophila:
 Eremnophila asperata (W.Fox, 1897)
 Eremnophila aureonotata (Cameron, 1888)
 Eremnophila auromaculata (Pérez, 1891)
 Eremnophila binodis (Fabricius, 1798)
 Eremnophila catamarcensis (Schrottky, 1910)
 Eremnophila eximia (Lepeletier de Saint Fargeau, 1845)
 Eremnophila melanaria (Dahlbom, 1843)
 Eremnophila opulenta (Guérin-Méneville, 1838)
 Eremnophila willinki (Menke, 1964)

References

External links

 

Sphecidae
Hymenoptera genera